Brochosomes are intricately structured microscopic granules secreted by leafhoppers (the family Cicadellidae of the insect order Hemiptera) and typically found on their body surface and, more rarely, eggs.  Brochosomes were first described in 1952 with the aid of an electron microscope. Brochosomes are hydrophobic and help keep the insect cuticle clean. These particles have also been found in samples of air and can easily contaminate foreign objects, which explains erroneous reports of brochosomes on other insects.

Structure and composition

The name, derived from the Greek words βρóχoς ("brochos": mesh of a net) and σωμα ("soma": body), refers to the characteristic reticulated surface of the granules.  Most species of leafhoppers produce hollow spherical brochosomes, 0.2–0.7 micrometres in diameter, with a honeycombed outer wall.  They often consist of 20 hexagonal and 12 pentagonal cells, making the outline of each brochosome approximating a truncated icosahedron – the geometry of a soccer ball and a C60 buckminsterfullerene molecule.  The chemical composition of brochosomes includes several kinds of proteins and, according to some studies, lipids. The main protein family, called brochosomins, and other kinds of proteins identified in the composition of brochosomes and their corresponding genes show no relationship to proteins and genes of any organisms outside of Membracoidea and thus are considered to be examples of orphan genes.

Origin

Brochosomes are produced within cells of specialized glandular segments of the Malpighian tubules – the primary excretory organs of insects, which often serve additional functions.  Each cell simultaneously manufactures a large number of brochosomes within its Golgi complexes and eventually releases them into the lumen of the tubule.

Functions

After each molt, most leafhopper species release droplets of the brochosome-containing fluid through the anus and actively spread them over the newly formed integument.  This behavior is called anointing. Dry brochosomes are further distributed across the body and appendages in repeated bouts of grooming, in which leafhoppers scrub themselves with their legs.  The transport of brochosomes is facilitated by groups and rows of strong setae on the legs.  The resulting coat makes the integument highly repellent to water (superhydrophobic) and to the leafhopper’s own liquid excreta, the latter often being sugary and sticky, and thus potentially dangerous for the insect.  Additional protective functions of the brochosomal coating have been hypothesized. For example, there is evidence that the anti reflective property of brochosome make surfaces coated by it appear similar to a leaf in the eyes of insects thus it can be used as camouflage for the eggs.
	
In several New World genera of the leafhopper subfamily Cicadellinae (including the glassy-winged sharpshooter and related species) brochosomes are also used as a coating on egg masses. In gravid females from these genera, the Malpighian tubules switch over from production of regular brochosomes, described above, to production of larger, typically elongate particles, up to 20 micrometres in length.  Prior to laying eggs, the female places masses of such brochosomes onto its forewings, and later scrapes them off onto the freshly laid eggs with its hindlegs.  The resulting powdery coat may serve various protective functions, including protection against egg-parasitoids from the order Hymenoptera (Chalcidoidea).  The shape and sculpture of such "egg" brochosomes can vary significantly among species, providing additional characteristics for species identification.

References

External links
Brochosomes by R. A. Rakitov, Illinois Natural History Survey
Leafhopper Egg Brochosomes Image Database by R. A. Rakitov, Illinois Natural History Survey

Cicadellidae
Auchenorrhyncha
Insect anatomy